Steve Edward Hegg (born December 3, 1963) is a retired track cyclist and road bicycle racer from the United States, who was a professional rider from 1988 to 2000. He represented the US at the 1984 Summer Olympics in Los Angeles, California, where he won the gold medal in the 4000m individual pursuit and silver in the 4000m team pursuit.

In road bicycle racing, Hegg became the first three-time winner of the United States national individual time trial championship, winning the elite men's race in 1990, 1995 and 1996.  In 1994, Hegg captured the United States national road race championship.

Major results

1984
 Olympic Games
1st  Individual pursuit
1st  Team pursuit
 1st  Individual pursuit, National Track Championships
1987
 1st  Team time trial (with Kent Bostick, John Frey & Andrew Paulin), Pan American Games
1989
 1st  Individual pursuit, National Track Championships
1990
 1st  Time trial, National Road Championships
1992
 1st Stage 11 Tour DuPont
1993
 1st Stage 5 Cascade Cycling Classic
 1st Prologue (ITT) Redlands Bicycle Classic
 10th Overall Tour DuPont
1994
 1st Stage 3 Redlands Bicycle Classic
1995
 1st  Time trial, National Road Championships
 3rd Overall Tour of China
1st Prologue
 4th Overall West Virginia Classic
1st Stage 3 (ITT)
1996
 1st  Time trial, National Road Championships
1998
 2nd Manhattan Beach Grand Prix
1999
 2nd Time trial, National Road Championships
2000
 3rd Time trial, National Road Championships

References

External links
 
 databaseOlympics

1963 births
Living people
American male cyclists
Cyclists at the 1984 Summer Olympics
Cyclists at the 1996 Summer Olympics
Olympic gold medalists for the United States in cycling
Olympic silver medalists for the United States in cycling
American cycling road race champions
Cyclists from California
Medalists at the 1984 Summer Olympics
American track cyclists
Pan American Games medalists in cycling
Pan American Games gold medalists for the United States
Cyclists at the 1987 Pan American Games
Medalists at the 1987 Pan American Games